Johan Arango (born 5 February 1991) is a Colombian professional footballer who plays as midfielder for Binacional.

International career
José Pékerman called up Arango for a training squad with the senior Colombia squad in February 2016.

References

External links 
 

1991 births
Living people
Colombian footballers
Colombian expatriate footballers
Association football midfielders
Categoría Primera A players
Categoría Primera B players
Saudi Professional League players
Ascenso MX players
Peruvian Primera División players
Independiente Medellín footballers
América de Cali footballers
Atlético F.C. footballers
Deportes Quindío footballers
Universitario Popayán footballers
Uniautónoma F.C. footballers
Once Caldas footballers
Deportivo Pasto footballers
Independiente  Santa Fe footballers
Al Batin FC players
Correcaminos UAT footballers
Deportivo Binacional FC players
Colombian expatriate sportspeople in Mexico
Colombian expatriate sportspeople in Saudi Arabia
Colombian expatriate sportspeople in Peru
Expatriate footballers in Mexico
Expatriate footballers in Saudi Arabia
Expatriate footballers in Peru
Footballers from Cali